Events from the year 1976 in Scotland.

Incumbents 

 Secretary of State for Scotland and Keeper of the Great Seal – Willie Ross until 8 April; then Bruce Millan

Law officers 
 Lord Advocate – Ronald King Murray
 Solicitor General for Scotland – John McCluskey, ennobled as Lord McCluskey

Judiciary 
 Lord President of the Court of Session and Lord Justice General – Lord Emslie
 Lord Justice Clerk – Lord Wheatley
 Chairman of the Scottish Land Court – Lord Birsay

Events 
 18 January – The Scottish Labour Party is formed as a breakaway from the UK-wide party.
 6 February – Hunterston B nuclear power station begins generating electricity.
 7 July – Scottish MP David Steel is elected as new leader of the Liberal Party.
 14 October – Post Office Telephones take the UK's last manual public telephone exchange out of service on Portree.
 11 November – Brent oilfield production begins in the East Shetland Basin.
 12 November – Disappearance of Renee MacRae and her 3-year-old son Andrew from Inverness; this becomes Britain's longest-running missing persons case.
 The Signet Office is merged into the Court of Session.
 Inverkip power station is commissioned.
 Whalsay Golf Club, Britain's most northerly, is founded in Shetland.

Births 
 13 January – Ross McCall, actor
 20 January – Kirsty Gallacher, television presenter
 23 February – Kelly Macdonald, actress
 23 March – Chris Hoy, Olympic gold medal winning cyclist
 3 June – Gregg McClymont, historian and politician
 5 June – Jack Ross, footballer and manager
 20 July – Damian Barr, writer
 24 July – Laura Fraser, actress
 8 August – Laura Kuenssberg, Italian-born political journalist
 10 August – Ian Murray, Labour MP for Edinburgh South
 25 August – Gail McConnell, physicist
 16 November – Danny Wallace, comedian and broadcast presenter
 date unknown – Chris Stout, fiddle player

Deaths 
 8 January – Robert Forgan, Scottish-English physician and politician (born 1891)
 11 February – Charlie Naughton, actor (born 1886)
 18 February – William Robb, footballer (born 1895)
 13 March – Ann Henderson, sculptor (born 1921)
 28 March – Ian Garrow, army officer (born 1908)
 22 April – Stanley Cursiter, painter and curator (born 1887)
 28 May – Oliver Brown, nationalist political activist (born 1903)
 20 October – Jane Duncan (Elizabeth Jane Cameron), novelist (born 1910)

See also 

 1976 in Northern Ireland
 1976 in Wales

References 

 
Scotland
Years of the 20th century in Scotland
1970s in Scotland